Western Province Command was a command of the South African Army.

History

Origin

Union Defence Force
Under the Union Defence Force, South Africa was originally divided into 9 military districts. By the 1930s this area became Cape Command. Cape Command, (with its headquarters at the Castle of Good Hope, Cape Town, included 3rd Infantry Brigade, 8th Infantry Brigade (Oudtshoorn), the Coast Artillery Brigade (two heavy batteries, two medium batteries, and the Cape Field Artillery), and a battery of the 1st Anti-Aircraft Regiment.

Western Province Command itself appears to have formed in 1959. Brig Magnus Malan, later Chief of the SADF, took command in 1971.

SADF
From 1 August 1974, units transferred from Western Province Command to the new 71 Motorised Brigade included the Cape Field Artillery, the Cape Town Highlanders, Regiment Westelike Provinsie, Regiment Boland, Regiment Oranjerivier, a South African Engineer Corps field squadron, 74 Signal Squadron SACS, 4 Maintenance Unit, 30 Field Workshop SAOSC, and 3 Field Ambulance. 12 Supply and Transport Company, originally established on 22 August 1961, became 4 Maintenance Unit on 1 September 1971.

By the early 1980s Western Province Command included the Cape Garrison Artillery, 101 Signal Squadron, 6 Base Ordnance Depot, Command Workshops (all at Cape Town) the South African Cape Corps Battalion (Eerste River, Western Cape), 2 Military Hospital, 3 Field Ambulance, and three Commandos (all at Wynberg) and 10 Anti-Aircraft Regiment SAA and 4 Electronics Workshops (both at Youngsfield Military Base at Ottery, Cape Town).

Disbandment
This Command was disbanded  after the South African Defence Review 1998.

Groups and Commando units

Group 1 (Youngsfield) 
 Overberg Commando
 False Bay Commando
 Koeberg Commando
 Lions Head Commando
 Skiereiland Commando
 Swartland Commando
 Tygerberg Commando
 Wildcoast Commando
 Wynberg Commando

Group 31 (Wellington) 
 Caledon Commando
 Paarl Commando
 Stellenbosch Commando
 Swellendam Commando
 Winterberg Commando
 Worcester Commando

Group 40 (Wingsfield) 
 Clanwilliam Commando
 Piketberg Commando
 Swartland Commando
 Van Rhynsdorp Commando
 West Coast Commando

Commanders

See also 
 South African Army Order of Battle 1940

Notes

References

Commands of the South African Army
Disbanded military units and formations in Cape Town
Military units and formations established in 1959
Military units and formations disestablished in the 1990s